Krugle delivers continuously updated, federated access to all of the code and technical information in the enterprise.  Krugle search helps an organization pinpoint critical code patterns and application issues - immediately and at massive scale.

Krugle finished its beta phase and went live on June 14th, 2006.

On February 17, 2009, it was announced that Aragon Consulting Group would acquire the Krugle assets and focus on the enterprise.

References

External links 
 
 Wired Article about Krugle (February 2006)
 InfoWorld post about Krugle (July 2006)

Code search engines
Internet search engines